The 26th edition of the Vuelta Ciclista de Chile was held from March 27 to April 5, 2003.

Stages

2003-03-27: Concepción — Concepción (4.5 km)

2003-03-28: San Pedro de La Paz — Chillán (135 km)

2003-03-29: Chillán — Linares (211 km)

2003-03-30: Linares — Talca (122 km)

2003-03-30: Talca — Pencahue (20 km)

2003-03-31: Talca — Licante (70 km)

2003-03-31: Licante — Curicó (120 km)

2003-04-01: Curicó — Pichilemu (160 km)

2003-04-02: Pichilemu — San Antonio (140 km)

2003-04-03: Melipilla — Farellones (125 km)

2003-04-04: Limache — Limache (128 km)

2003-04-05: Quilpué — Quilicura (190 km)

2003-04-06: Santiago — Santiago (71.4 km)

Final classification

Teams 

Lider Trek Bio-Bio

Alas Rojas

Ace Byrc Curico

Brazil National Team

Doñihue

Colavita Bolla

Ekono Alamo Rent A

Marco Polo

La Polar

Trust House

Agua Mineral Rari

UPMC-La Polar

Peñaflor Lascar

Venezuela National Team

Publiguías

Transportes Romero

Vinci Los Angeles

References 
 cyclingnews

Vuelta Ciclista de Chile
Chile
Vuelta Ciclista
March 2003 sports events in South America
April 2003 sports events in South America